Matthew 4 is the fourth chapter of the Gospel of Matthew in the New Testament of Christian Bible. Many translations of the gospel and biblical commentaries separate the first section of chapter 4 (verses 1-11, Matthew's account of the Temptation of Jesus by the devil) from the remaining sections, which deal with Jesus' first public preaching and the gathering of his first disciples.

Text 
The original text was written in Koine Greek. This chapter is divided into 25 verses.

Textual witnesses
Some early manuscripts containing the text of this chapter are:
Papyrus 101 (~ 250; extant verses 1-3)
Papyrus 102 (3rd century; extant verses 11-12, 22-23)
Codex Vaticanus (325-350)
Codex Sinaiticus (330-360)
Codex Bezae (~400)
Codex Washingtonianus (~400)
Codex Ephraemi Rescriptus (~450)

Structure 
The New King James Version organises this chapter as follows:
 - Satan tempts Jesus
 - Jesus Begins His Galilean Ministry
 - Four Fishermen Called as Disciples
 - Jesus Heals a Great Multitude

John Calvin's Commentary treats verses 1-4, 5-11, 13-16 and 18-25 as separate sections.

Temptation of Christ 

The section of this chapter dealing with the temptation of Jesus by Satan is unquestionably the best known and most studied portion. Satan tempts him three times: in 4:3 with food to relieve Jesus' fast, in 4:6 with testing God, and in 4:9 with control of all the kingdoms of the earth.

Commentary
There are a number of theories regarding the temptations. One suggests that the three temptations show Jesus rejecting various visions of the Messiah. In the first temptation he shows that he will not be an "economic" messiah, who will use his powers to feed the world's hungry. In the second that he will not be a miracle worker who puts on great spectacles, and the third that he will not be a political saviour but rather a spiritual one. Many scholars today reject this view. A popular theory today is that Jesus is demonstrating that he will not fail where the people of Israel did. There are several references to the period after the Exodus and this is the section of the scripture Jesus' draws his quotes from. In that section the Israelites anger God by testing him and they soon compromise their principles for political power, mistakes that Jesus does not make.

In the Gospel of Mark, chapter 1, the temptation narrative takes only two verses. Luke's account is quite similar to Matthew's, with only somewhat different wording and with the order of the second and third temptations reversed. It is thus widely believed that much of this section in Matthew came from the hypothetical document Q. Schweizer notes that Q likely contained little except the actual dialogue, as the extra information is quite different in the two gospels. Commentary writer David Hill argues that Mark is written in a manner which assumes his audience is already familiar with the temptation narrative, so this dialogue may have been widely known by the early Christians and thus not necessarily in Q.

Scholars generally consider Matthew's account to be more likely to be the original arrangement; however, Luke's version became more popular in the tradition.

Literary significance
The temptation scene related here has inspired a number of works of literature. It is briefly recounted in Paradise Lost and is retold in great detail and expanded upon in Paradise Regained. It also is an important inspiration for The Brothers Karamazov and Murder in the Cathedral. The book The Last Temptation of Christ and its 1989 film adaptation also expand upon Christ being tempted by Satan.

Commencement of Jesus' ministry
The remaining verses of this chapter (verses 12 to 25) are generally seen as the introduction to the ministry of Jesus, which will take up the next several chapters of the Gospel and in the Sermon on the Mount, which begins immediately after this chapter. Jesus begins to preach a gospel of repentance: his words are the same as those of John the Baptist, now imprisoned in Machaerus Palace:
Repent, for the kingdom of heaven is at hand.

Verses 18 to 22 describe the calling of the first four fishermen, who become his first disciples: two, Simon Peter and Andrew, were casting a net into the sea, and two, James, and John, working with Zebedee their father, were repairing their nets. The disciples abandon their possessions and family to become what Jesus calls "fishers of men". 

The final three verses introduce the crowds whom Jesus addresses. These verses also serve as a summary of Jesus' ministry outlining the three forms it takes: teaching, preaching, and healing.

Verses

Full text
In the King James Version this chapter reads:

Then was Jesus led up of the Spirit into the wilderness to be tempted of the devil.
And when he had fasted forty days and forty nights, he was afterward an hungred.
And when the tempter came to him, he said, If thou be the Son of God, command that these stones be made bread.
But he answered and said, It is written, Man shall not live by bread alone, but by every word that proceedeth out of the mouth of God.
Then the devil taketh him up into the holy city, and setteth him on a pinnacle of the temple,
And saith unto him, If thou be the Son of God, cast thyself down: for it is written, He shall give his angels charge concerning thee: and in their hands they shall bear thee up, lest at any time thou dash thy foot against a stone.
Jesus said unto him, It is written again, Thou shalt not tempt the Lord thy God.
Again, the devil taketh him up into an exceeding high mountain, and sheweth him all the kingdoms of the world, and the glory of them;
And saith unto him, All these things will I give thee, if thou wilt fall down and worship me.
Then saith Jesus unto him, Get thee hence, Satan: for it is written, Thou shalt worship the Lord thy God, and him only shalt thou serve.
Then the devil leaveth him, and, behold, angels came and ministered unto him.
Now when Jesus had heard that John was cast into prison, he departed into Galilee;
And leaving Nazareth, he came and dwelt in Capernaum, which is upon the sea coast, in the borders of Zabulon and Nephthalim:
That it might be fulfilled which was spoken by Esaias the prophet, saying,
The land of Zabulon, and the land of Nephthalim, by the way of the sea, beyond Jordan, Galilee of the Gentiles;
The people which sat in darkness saw great light; and to them which sat in the region and shadow of death light is sprung up.
From that time Jesus began to preach, and to say, Repent: for the kingdom of heaven is at hand.
And Jesus, walking by the sea of Galilee, saw two brethren, Simon called Peter, and Andrew his brother, casting a net into the sea: for they were fishers.
And he saith unto them, Follow me, and I will make you fishers of men.
And they straightway left their nets, and followed him.
And going on from thence, he saw other two brethren, James the son of Zebedee, and John his brother, in a ship with Zebedee their father, mending their nets; and he called them.
And they immediately left the ship and their father, and followed him.
And Jesus went about all Galilee, teaching in their synagogues, and preaching the gospel of the kingdom, and healing all manner of sickness and all manner of disease among the people.
And his fame went throughout all Syria: and they brought unto him all sick people that were taken with divers diseases and torments, and those which were possessed with devils, and those which were lunatick, and those that had the palsy; and he healed them.
And there followed him great multitudes of people from Galilee, and from Decapolis, and from Jerusalem, and from Judaea, and from beyond Jordan.

Old Testament references
 : Psalm

See also
Jewish messianism
Messianic prophecies of Jesus
Mount of Temptation
Related Bible parts: Isaiah 9, Mark 1, Luke 4

References

Further reading 

Albright, W.F. and C.S. Mann. "Matthew." The Anchor Bible Series. New York: Doubleday & Company, 1971.
Clarke, Howard W. The Gospel of Matthew and its Readers: A Historical Introduction to the First Gospel. Bloomington: Indiana University Press, 2003.
France, R.T. The Gospel According to Matthew: an Introduction and Commentary. Leicester: Inter-Varsity, 1985.
Gundry, Robert H. Matthew a Commentary on his Literary and Theological Art. Grand Rapids: William B. Eerdmans Publishing Company, 1982.

Jones, Alexander. The Gospel According to St. Matthew. London: Geoffrey Chapman, 1965.

External links
 King James Bible - Wikisource
English Translation with Parallel Latin Vulgate
Online Bible at GospelHall.org (ESV, KJV, Darby, American Standard Version, Bible in Basic English)
Multiple bible versions at Bible Gateway (NKJV, NIV, NRSV etc.)

 
Matthew 04
Temptation of Christ